Hexafluoropropane may refer to several isomeric organofluorides:
 1,1,1,2,2,3-Hexafluoropropane, R-236cb, CAS 677-56-5	
 1,1,1,2,3,3-Hexafluoropropane, R-236ea, CAS 431-63-0	
 1,1,1,3,3,3-Hexafluoropropane, R-236fa, FE-36, CAS 690-39-1
 1,1,2,2,2,3-Hexafluoropropane	

See also: hexafluoropropene